Turkey  has been participating at the  Deaflympics since 1961 and  has earned a total of 119 medals.

Medal tallies

Summer Deaflympics

Winter Deaflympics

Medals

Source:

Medals by Summer Games

Medals by Winter Games

See also
Turkish Deaf Sport Federation
Turkey at the Paralympics
Turkey at the Olympics

References

External links
Deaflympics official website
2017 Deaflympics

 
Parasports in Turkey